Dhondtiscidae is a family of bryozoans belonging to the order Cheilostomatida.

Genera:
 Dhondtiscus Gordon, 1989

References

Cheilostomatida